Pennsylvania Association of Independent Schools (PAIS)
Villa Maria Academy is an all-girls Catholic college-preparatory high school located in Malvern, Pennsylvania. The school was formed and carried out by the Sisters, Servants of the Immaculate Heart of Mary. Growth and development is key to this institution whether it be spiritually or intellectually.  It is operated independently and with the blessing of the Roman Catholic Archdiocese of Philadelphia.

Founding and early history 
The foundation of the academy dates to July, 1872. At that time, the Sisters, Servants of the Immaculate Heart of Mary transferred their motherhouse, novitiate, and boarding school from Reading to West Chester, PA. Occupying the property formerly owned by the Pennsylvania Military Academy, the school flourished in West Chester until 1914, when Villa Maria moved to Immaculata College, which today houses the retired sisters.

In 1924, the Sisters acquired the property of William R. Warner, Jr. in Green Tree, where the high school remains today. May 5, 1925 marked the opening of Villa Maria at Green Tree. Regina Mundi Hall was constructed in 1955, and had many later additions and expansions.

In 1979, Villa Maria Lower School, grades K-8, was moved to a wing of the House of Studies at Immaculata. At this time the high school acquired St. Joseph Hall, which had been built in 1965. In 1985, plans were undertaken to build the Marian Center, an Arts/Athletic complex. The Athletic Center, Phase 1 of the total project, opened in December, 1987. Phase Two was completed in May, 1997; new soccer/lacrosse, softball, and hockey fields, an all-weather track, and five tennis courts were also constructed. In the early 2000s, other renovations and expansions were completed, which included an addition to St. Joseph's Hall, renovation of the cafeteria in Regina Mundi, and campus security measures.

Campus
Villa Maria's  campus includes two academic buildings (Regina Mundi and St. Joseph's Hall) and another building with the gymnasium and a connected auditorium (Marian Center). In 2015, the Maurene Polley turf field was built in honor of the legacy of the former field hockey coach of 43 years, National Field Hockey Coaches Hall of Fame, and athletics director.

Villa Maria is a relatively small school, with a staff of 62 (including both religious and laypeople) and 400-500 students.  It offers college-prep, honors, and Advanced Placement (AP) courses, as well as a Diocesan Scholars Program for qualifying seniors which allows them to attend neighboring colleges and receive college credits.

Notable alumnae
Mary Pat Christie, First Lady of New Jersey and wife of Governor Chris Christie, former Vice President at Cantor Fitzgerald

Notes and references

External links
 Official website
 Villa Maria Lower School (PK-8)

Catholic secondary schools in Pennsylvania
Educational institutions established in 1872
Girls' schools in Pennsylvania
Schools in Chester County, Pennsylvania
1872 establishments in Pennsylvania